Aestivation or estivation is the positional arrangement of the parts of a flower within a flower bud before it has opened. Aestivation is also sometimes referred to as praefoliation or prefoliation, but these terms may also mean vernation: the arrangement of leaves within a vegetative bud.

Aestivation can be an important taxonomic diagnostic; for example Malvaceae flower buds have valvate sepals, with the exception of the genera Fremontodendron and Chiranthodendron, which have sometimes been misplaced as a result.

Terminology 
The terms used to describe aestivation are the same as those used to describe leaf vernation.

Classes of aestivation include:
 crumpled
 decussate
 imbricate – overlapping
 contorted or twisted – every petal or sepal is outside its neighbour on one margin, and inside its neighbour on the other margin.
 cochleate – spirally twisted.
 contortiplicate – contorted and also plicate.
 quincuncial – with five parts, where two petals or sepals are outside all others, two are inside all others, and the fifth is outside on one margin and inside on the other.
 induplicate – folded inwards.
 open – petals or sepals do not overlap or even touch each other .
 reduplicate – folded outwards.
 valvate – margins of adjacent petals or sepals touch each other without overlapping.
 vexillary – a special type of aestivation occurring in plants like pea; in this type of aestivation a large petal called standard encloses two smaller petals.

References 

+
Plant morphology